Sonoma is a genus of North American rove beetles in the subfamily Pselaphinae. At least 57 species are known—the majority from the Pacific Slope, ranging from Southern California to Alaska—with other species occurring in the Appalachians and the Eastern United States.

Species
These 57 species belong to the genus Sonoma:

 Sonoma agitator Ferro, 2016
 Sonoma baylessae Ferro and Carlton, 2010
 Sonoma brasstownensis Ferro and Carlton, 2010
 Sonoma cardiac Ferro, 2016
 Sonoma carltoni Ferro, 2016
 Sonoma cascadia Chandler, 1986 i c g
 Sonoma cataloochee Ferro, 2016
 Sonoma caterinoi Ferro, 2016
 Sonoma cavifrons Casey, 1887 i c g
 Sonoma chandleri Ferro, 2016
 Sonoma chouljenkoi Ferro and Carlton, 2010
 Sonoma cobra Ferro, 2016
 Sonoma colberti Ferro, 2016
 Sonoma conifera Chandler, 1986 i c g
 Sonoma corticina Casey, 1887 i c g
 Sonoma cuneata Marsh and Schuster, 1962 i c g
 Sonoma cygnus Ferro and Carlton, 2010
 Sonoma dilopha Marsh and Schuster, 1962 i c g
 Sonoma dolabra Marsh and Schuster, 1962 i c g
 Sonoma gilae Ferro and Carlton, 2010
 Sonoma gimmeli Ferro and Carlton, 2010
 Sonoma grandiceps Casey, 1894 i c g
 Sonoma hespera Park and Wagner, 1962 i c g
 Sonoma holmesi Ferro and Carlton, 2010
 Sonoma humilis Marsh and Schuster, 1962 i c g
 Sonoma isabellae (LeConte, 1851) i c g b
 Sonoma konkoworum Chandler, 2003 i c g
 Sonoma margemina Park and Wagner, 1962 i c g
 Sonoma maryae Ferro, 2016
 Sonoma mayori Ferro and Carlton, 2010
 Sonoma nhunguyeni Ferro and Carlton, 2010
 Sonoma nicholsae Ferro and Carlton, 2010
 Sonoma olycalida Park and Wagner, 1962 i c g
 Sonoma parkorum Ferro and Carlton, 2010
 Sonoma parviceps (Mäklin, 1852) i c g b
 Sonoma petersi Chandler, 1986 i c g
 Sonoma priocera Marsh and Schuster, 1962 i c g
 Sonoma quellazaire Ferro, 2016
 Sonoma quercicola Chandler, 1986 i c g
 Sonoma repanda Marsh and Schuster, 1962 i c g
 Sonoma rossellinae Ferro, 2016
 Sonoma rubida Casey, 1894 i c g
 Sonoma russelli Chandler, 1986 i c g
 Sonoma sokolovi Ferro and Carlton, 2010
 Sonoma spadica Marsh and Schuster, 1962 i c g
 Sonoma squamishorum Chandler and Klimaszewski, 2009
 Sonoma stewarti Ferro, 2016
 Sonoma streptophorophallus Ferro and Carlton, 2010
 Sonoma tehamae Chandler, 2003 i c g
 Sonoma tishechkini Ferro and Carlton, 2010
 Sonoma tolulae (LeConte, 1849) i c g
 Sonoma tridens Ferro and Carlton, 2010
 Sonoma triloba Marsh and Schuster, 1962 i c g
 Sonoma twaini Ferro, 2016
 Sonoma vanna Marsh and Schuster, 1962 i c g
 Sonoma virgo Ferro, 2016
 Sonoma wintuorum Chandler, 2003 i c g

Data sources: i = ITIS, c = Catalogue of Life, g = GBIF, b = Bugguide.net

References

Pselaphinae genera
Beetles of North America